Leeanda Antoinette Reddy is a South African actress. She is best known for her roles in the popular series Cape Town, Scandal! and Isidingo.

Personal life
She was born in Durban, South Africa. She spent her childhood in Chatsworth and Phoenix in Durban. She completed her education at Crystal Point Secondary school, then got her BA degree in Speech and Drama at the University of KwaZulu-Natal in Durban.

She is married to her longtime partner Clive Chetty. The couple has two sons: Yorke and Zion Chetty.

Career
She started her acting career with theater productions in several theaters in South Africa such as Opera and Loft theaters, Market and Civic theaters, Durban playhouse, Sneddon, and Grahamstown. Later, her talent was recognized by The Indian Council for Cultural Relations (ICCR) where she was invited to present a solo play At the Edge. The play was performed at the International Theater Festival in New Delhi, India, in 2000. The role became her breakthrough in acting career. Leeanda has performed in South Africa, India, and Scotland.

Meanwhile, she joined the television and hosted the magazine show 'Big City'. Then she was shifted to hosting 'Citylife'. In 2005, she was invited to play the role, 'Vanashree Devan', on the eTV television soapie Scandal!. She played the role until 2006 and then joined with the serial Backstage on eTV. In 2013, she performed with Naomi Watts in the film Diana. In 2016, she acted in the crime thriller television serial Cape Town and played the role 'Kumari Nayar'. In 2017, she appeared in the international film The Dark Tower, and played the role 'Dr. Weizak' along with renowned actor Idris Elba.

In 2008, she acted with Leon Schuster in popular comedy film Mr. Bones 2: Back from the Past. She is also the co-founder of film production company 'Mustard Seed Productions' founded in 2008 with her friend, Krijay Govender. In 2012, she starred in the play iNkaba as 'Prevashnee'. In 2015, she joined the cast of popular soapie Isidingo and played the popular role 'Priya Kumar'. In 2016, she was nominated for the SAFTA's Best Lead Actress award.

Apart from acting, she is also a writer, director, producer of stage productions where she was featured in the VW Toureg campaign, Woolworth's billboard, print, billboard TVC campaigns, and the Budget Insurance television infomercials. Meanwhile, she became a stand-up comedian that performed in both international and local theaters. In stage, she has performed comedy roles including: 'Lady Macbeth' in Stephen Gurney's Macbeth, 'Viola' in Ralph, and 'Titania' in A Midsummer Night's Dream. She also played thirty different characters in a one-woman show titled Ronnie Govender.

Filmography

References

External links
 

Living people
South African television actresses
South African stage actresses
South African film actresses
People from Durban
Year of birth missing (living people)